Niklas Mattsson (born 16 March 1992) is a snowboarder from Sweden. He won a silver medal at the 2011 FIS Snowboarding World Championships in the slopestyle event. Mattsson was born in Sundsvall.

References

External links
 
 
 
 
 

1992 births
Living people
Swedish male snowboarders
Olympic snowboarders of Sweden
Snowboarders at the 2014 Winter Olympics
Snowboarders at the 2018 Winter Olympics
Snowboarders at the 2022 Winter Olympics
People from Sundsvall
Sportspeople from Västernorrland County
21st-century Swedish people